Lepyronia angulifera, the angular spittlebug, is a species of spittlebug in the family Aphrophoridae. It is found in the Caribbean Sea and North America.

Subspecies
These two subspecies belong to the species Lepyronia angulifera:
 Lepyronia angulifera angulifera
 Lepyronia angulifera robusta Metcalf & Bruner

References

External links

 

Articles created by Qbugbot
Insects described in 1876
Aphrophoridae